The siege of Toulouse occurred from 22 September 1217 to 25 July 1218 during the Albigensian Crusade. It was third of a series of sieges of the city during the height of Crusader efforts to put down Catharism (and the local Languedocian nobility). It ended in the repulsion of the Crusaders and the death of their leader, Simon IV de Montfort.

Background 
In 1211 Simon IV de Montfort conducted his first siege of Toulouse, one that featured no siege engines is widely considered a tactical blunder and was ultimately unsuccessful. Two years later at the Battle of Muret much of Toulouse's military forces were defeated along with its Count Raymond VI, Count of Toulouse. Though Simon was practical the Count of Toulouse by 1214, it was not Pope Innocent III's decision following the Fourth Council of the Lateran in November 1215 that it was made official. Simultaneously Raymond VI and his son, Raymond VII, began to plot a double pronged invasion into Languedoc to take their territories back.

While Raymond the Elder went to Spain to raise an army and attack Simon from the rear, his son went to the Rhône valley and laid siege to Beaucaire in May 1216. The citizens of Beaucaire had been forewarned of Raymond VII's return and throw the gates open to welcome him into the city and fight the unprepared crusader garrison. Ultimately the besieged crusaders held out in a castle outside the city walls for four months. By the time Simon arrived to help them, the garrison had been forced to eat their own horses. Raymond the Younger had taken Beaucaire and garrisoned its walls, while also keep the castle that the former garrison lay in under tight guard. Simon and his crusader forces made numerous attempts to besiege the city and make contact with their fellow men in the castle, all to no avail. Finally on August 24, 1216 Simon was forced to accept terms, and that he had suffered his first major loss of the Albigensian Crusade and to a young unseasoned commander nonetheless.

Immediately following this loss, Simon was informed that the citizens of Toulouse had begun plotting with Raymond the Elder, and he raced back to the city. By this time Simon owned his troops their wages and decided he would make Toulouse pay them. Upon his return he threw a delegation of the distinguished citizens into the Château Narbonnais and had them held under guard. At Simon's bidding "armed bands of crusaders passed through the streets breaking into aristocratic house, carrying off coins and jewelry".

Battle 
In 1216 Simon captured Toulouse and proclaimed himself Count of Toulouse, but while he was elsewhere, on 12 September 1217, the rival claimant, Raymond VI, retook the city without a fight. Simon returned in haste to besiege the city once more. Despite that he had ordered the city's defenses dismantled while he was in control, he found its defenses intact and its walls well-manned. His forces were too small to surround it and the siege dragged on through the winter months with little activity.

In the spring of 1218, a certain maestre (master) Bertran of Toulouse suggested to the people that they construct a trebuchet. The city's carpenters immediately took up the task. Meanwhile, on 3 June, the Crusaders constructed (or had brought in) a "cat" (a leather-covered, steeply-gabled mobile shelter) in order to approach the walls. The defenders' trebuchet swiftly dispatched it and, on 25 June, they sortied to burn the cat, which they did. It killed him. The leadership of the Crusade fell to his son Amaury, but the siege was lifted a month later.

The events of the siege prompted the resident troubadour (and possibly priest) Raimon Escrivan to compose a song, Senhors, l'autrier vi ses falhida, on it. The song, a tenso, presents a mock debate between two siege machines (the trebuchet and the cat) in which the trebuchet wins.

References

Sources

Guillaume de Puylaurens. The Siege of Toulouse in 1217–18. Cronica.
Riquer, Martín de. Los trovadores: historia literaria y textos. 3 vol. Barcelona: Planeta, 1975. 

Conflicts in 1217
Conflicts in 1218
1217 in Europe
1218 in Europe
1210s in France
Albigensian Crusade
Toulouse 1217
Toulouse (1217-1218)
Battles in Occitanie
History of Toulouse